Alberto Valentim do Carmo Neto (born 22 March 1975) is a Brazilian football manager and former player who played as a right back.

Playing career

Brazil
Born in Oliveira, Minas Gerais, Alberto started his professional career at Guarani of São Paulo state. After a spell at Inter de Limeira, then spent 4 seasons at Athletico Paranaense, which also loaned to São Paulo and Flamengo for Copa do Brasil, Campeonato Paulista and Campeonato Carioca, and Cruzeiro for the 1997 Intercontinental Cup.

Udinese
In January 2000, he was signed by Italian Serie A club Udinese via Rentistas for US$6.65 million. He played his first Serie A match on 23 January, replaced Roberto Sosa in the 79th minutes. The match Udinese won Venezia 5–2. He played 14 league matches in the first season. But in September 2000, along with Warley, were found using a fake Portuguese passport by Polish officials while heading to Poland for the match against Polonia Warsaw. It followed by an investigation of Italian police, and found 2 more teammate namely Jorginho Paulista and Alejandro Da Silva were using fake passport. It is because Serie A restricted each club could only had 5 non-European Union footballers and 3 in each match, a fake passport could increase their chance to win a contract with Italian club. However, that season Alberto played 27 league matches and scored 2 goals, as the quota system was abolished in the mid of season. In June 2001, Alberto, along with a dozen other including 3 of Alberto's teammate, were banned, 10 of them including Alberto for a year and 3 youth players for 6 months. but allowed to remain at Italy. The ban was later reduced. On 14 April 2002, he played his first league match after the ban, but replaced by Siyabonga Nomvethe at half-time. The match Udinese lost 0–1 to Verona.

The then played 2 more seasons, for Udinese.

Siena
In January 2005, after just played 2 league matches for the Udine club, he joined another Serie A side Siena. In July 2005, Siena signed him from Udinese in co-ownership deal. He played 31 league matches that season for the Serie A struggler and the Tuscany side choose to sign him permanently in 2006. But in 2006–07 season, he just played 10 starts in 16 Serie A appearances and in 2007–08 season with only 2 starts.

Return to Brazil
In September 2008, he signed a -year contract with Club Athletico Paranaense but only played 8 matches in national leagues.

Managerial career

In 2012, Valentim returned to Atlético Paranaense as an assistant manager. He left the club in the following year, and joined Palmeiras in 2014, also as an assistant.

On 13 December 2016, Valentim was announced as Red Bull Brasil manager. The following 18 April, after a poor campaign in the 2017 Campeonato Paulista, he was sacked.

On 24 June 2017, Valentim returned to Palmeiras, again as an assistant. On 13 October, he was appointed interim manager in the place of sacked Cuca. Despite finishing second, he was released by the club on 5 December.

On 13 February 2018, Valentim was named manager of Botafogo. On 19 June, he resigned after accepting an offer from an Egyptian Club, Pyramids FC.
 
On 18 August 2018, Valentim left Pyramids FC following a dispute with the club's owner "Turki Al Sheikh" regarding the future of the team's striker Ribamar. Just one week later, he has joined Vasco da Gama for the remainder of the Campeonato Brasileiro campaign.

Valentim was sacked on 21 April 2019, after losing the year's Campeonato Carioca. On 18 June, he took over fellow top-tier side Avaí, replacing fired Geninho, but returned to Botafogo on 11 October. He was dismissed by Bota for the second time on 9 February 2020, after a poor campaign in the Carioca.

On 1 April 2021, Valentim was named manager of top tier newcomers Cuiabá. He won the year's Campeonato Mato-Grossense, but was dismissed on 29 May after seven wins in ten matches.

On 1 October 2021, Valentim was named manager of Athletico Paranaense, still in the top tier. He left on a mutual agreement the following 10 April, after a 0–4 loss to São Paulo in the 2022 Série A opener.

On 15 June 2022, Valentim replaced Mozart at the helm of CSA. On 8 August, however, he was dismissed.

Managerial statistics

Honours

Player 
 Guarani 
 Copa São Paulo de Futebol Júnior: 1994

 Inter de Limeira 
 Campeonato Paulista Série A2: 1996

 São Paulo 
 Campeonato Paulista: 1998

 Udinese 
 UEFA Intertoto Cup: 2000

 Athletico Paranaense 
 Campeonato Paranaense: 2009

 Brazil U20 
 Toulon Tournament: 1995

 Individual 
 Bola de Prata: 1996

Manager 
 Botafogo 
 Campeonato Carioca: 2018

 Vasco da Gama 
 Taça Guanabara: 2019

 Cuiabá 
 Campeonato Mato-Grossense: 2021

 Athletico Paranaense 
 Copa Sudamericana: 2021

References

External links
 
 
 

1975 births
Living people
Sportspeople from Minas Gerais
Brazilian footballers
Association football defenders
Serie A players
Campeonato Brasileiro Série A players
Egyptian Premier League managers
Guarani FC players
Associação Atlética Internacional (Limeira) players
Club Athletico Paranaense players
São Paulo FC players
Cruzeiro Esporte Clube players
CR Flamengo footballers
Udinese Calcio players
A.C.N. Siena 1904 players
Brazilian football managers
Campeonato Brasileiro Série A managers
Club Athletico Paranaense managers
Sociedade Esportiva Palmeiras managers
Red Bull Brasil managers
Botafogo de Futebol e Regatas managers
CR Vasco da Gama managers
Avaí FC managers
Pyramids FC managers
Cuiabá Esporte Clube managers
Centro Sportivo Alagoano managers
Brazilian expatriate footballers
Brazilian expatriate football managers
Brazilian expatriate sportspeople in Italy
Brazilian expatriate sportspeople in Egypt
Expatriate footballers in Italy
Expatriate football managers in Egypt